Liu Xinyu (born 17 November 1991) is a Chinese footballer currently playing as a midfielder or forward for Shijiazhuang Ever Bright.

Club career
Liu Xinyu would play for second tier football club Hunan Billows where he established himself as versatile midfielder or forward for five seasons with the club. With his contract expiring he would move on a free transfer to Shijiazhuang Ever Bright on 15 February 2017. He would make his debut for the club on 18 March 2017 in a league game against Baoding Yingli ETS in a 2-0 defeat. He would go on to become a regular within the team and aid the club to gain promotion into the Chinese top tier when they came runners-up at the end of the 2019 league campaign.

Career statistics

References

External links

1991 births
Living people
Chinese footballers
Association football forwards
China League One players
Chinese Super League players
Hunan Billows players
Cangzhou Mighty Lions F.C. players